The Best Smooth Jazz... Ever! vol. 4 is fifteenth part of "The Best... Ever!" series. It contains more than 240 minutes of jazz songs. This compilation was released by EMI on May 22, 2009.

Track listing

CD 1
 Dean Martin – "Dream a Little Dream of Me"
 Chet Baker – "I Fall In Love Too Easily"
 Danny Williams – "I’ve Got You Under My Skin"
 Dinah Washington – "Lover Man"
 Matt Monro – "What A Wonderful World"
 Quincy Jones – "Soul Bossa Nova"
 Rosalia de Souza - "D'Improvviso"
 Marc Jordan & Molly Johnson – "Let's Waste Some Time"
 Aaron Tesser & The New Jazz Affair - "My Love Is A Song"
 Amos Lee – "Careless"
 Lynda Lovett & Philip Calder - "Close to You"
 Nicky Holland – "Ladykiller"
 Peter White & Basia – "Just Another Day"
 Pepe Jaramillo – "She"
 Perry Como - "Catch a Falling Star"
 Joe Whiting - "You Don't Know Me"
 Sinéad O'Connor - "Black Coffee"

CD 2
 Doris Day - "Sentimental Journey"
 Emme St. James - "Make Love to Me"
 Jonny Blu - "Girl From Ipanema"
 Coralie Clement – "L’ombre Et La Lumiere
 Steve Tyrell - "It Had To Be You"
 Edvard Larusson feat. Gudrun Gunnars - "Love Me Tonight"
 Lizz Wright – "Goodbye"
 Cassandra Wilson - "Lay Lady Lay"
 Sabrina Starke – "Do for Love"
 Traincha – "The Look of Love"
 Norah Jones – "Sunrise"
 Pete Belasco - "Without Within"
 Gladys Knight & the Pips - "Midnight Train To Georgia"
 Luther Vandross - "Never Too Much"
 Molly Johnson - "I Must Have Left My Heart"

CD 3
 Joss Stone – "Bruised But Not Broken"
 Aimee Allen - "What The Senses Know"
 Lloyd Marcus - "I Left My Heart In San Francisco"
 Jeanne Gies - "I Love Paris"
 Jack Hoban & Wendy Reizer - "Moonlight On The Sand"
 The Lou Donaldson Quartet - "The Things We Did Last Summer"
 Corinne Bailey Rae - "Till It Happens To You"
 June Christy - "Looking For A Boy"
 Freddie Jackson - "I Could Use A Little Love"
 Holly Cole - "Invitation To The Blues"
 S-Tone – "Negro"
 Ronnie Laws - "Love's Victory"
 Stacey Kent - "The Ice Hotel"
 Ferid feat. Marcin Nowakowski - "Menduza"
 Elisabeth Withers - "Simple Things"

CD 4
 Judy Garland - "I Can't Give You Anything But Love"
 Erma Franklin - "Piece Of My Heart"
 April Stevens - "Teach Me Tiger"
 Candi Staton - "How Can I Put Out The Flame"
 Shirley Bassey - "I Get A Kick Out Of You"
 Jeri Southern - "Isn't This A Lovely Day?"
 Mel Tormé - "Blue Moon"
 Nina Simone - "Willow Weep For Me"
 Horace Silver - "Song For My Father"
 Irene & Her Latin Jazz Band - "Summer Samba (So Nice)"
 Roy Ayers - "Everytime I See You"
 Anna Maria Flechero - "And I Love Him"
 Vanessa Williams - "Sister Moon"
 Dionne Warwick – "Don’t Make Me Over"
 Sammy Davis Jr - "The Way You Look Tonight"

Smooth Jazz
2009 compilation albums
Smooth jazz compilation albums